Félicien or Felicien is a given name. Notable people with the name include:

Félicien Du Bois (born 1983), Swiss professional ice hockey defenceman
Félicien Cattier (1869–1946), very prominent Belgian banker, financier and philanthropist
Félicien Champsaur (1858–1934), French novelist and journalist
Félicien Chapuis (1824–1879), Belgian doctor and entomologist
Félicien Courbet (1888–1967), Belgian water polo player and breaststroke swimmer
Félicien David (1810–1876), French composer
Perdita Felicien (born 1980), retired Canadian hurdler
Félicien Gatabazi (died 1994), Rwandan politician
Eugene Felicien Albert Goblet d'Alviella (1846–1925), lawyer, liberal senator of Belgium, Professor and rector of the Universite Libre de Bruxelles
Félicien Kabuga (born 1935), Rwandan businessman, accused of bankrolling and participating in the Rwandan Genocide
Félicien Mallefille (1813–1868), French novelist and playwright
Félicien Marceau (1913–2012), French novelist, playwright and essayist originally from Belgium
Félicien Mbanza (born 1977), former Burundian Attacker who last played with Croix de Savoie Gaillard in the France Championnat National
Félicien Menu de Ménil (1860–1930), French composer and Esperanto enthusiast
Desire-Felicien-Francois-Joseph Mercier (1851–1926), Belgian cardinal of the Roman Catholic Church and a noted scholar
Félicien Van De Putte (born 1898), Belgian long-distance runner
Félicien Rops (1833–1898), Belgian artist, known primarily as a printmaker in etching and aquatint
Félicien Henry Caignart de Saulcy (1832–1912), French entomologist specialising in Coleoptera
Louis Félicien de Saulcy (1807–1880), French numismatist, Orientalist and archaeologist
Félicien Singbo (born 1980), Beninois football player
Félicien M. Steichen (1926–2011), American Surgeon and Professor of Surgery
Félicien Tramel (1880–1948), French film actor
Félicien Trewey (1848–1920), French magician, mime, comedian, vaudevillian, tightrope walker, balance artist, dancer, musician, chapeaugraphist and shadowgraphist
Félicien Vervaecke (1907–1986), Belgian professional cyclist from 1930 to 1939

See also
Dolbeau-Saint-Félicien Airport, located 8.5 nautical miles southwest of Dolbeau-Mistassini, Quebec
Saint-Félicien, Ardèche, commune in the Ardèche department in southern France
Saint-Félicien, Quebec, city in the Canadian province of Quebec
Cégep de Saint-Félicien, CEGEP located at 1105 boulevard Hamel, Saint-Félicien, Quebec, Canada
Saint-Félicien cheese, cow's milk cheese produced in the Rhône-Alpes region of France
Zoo Sauvage de St-Félicien (English:Wild Zoo of St-Félicien) is one of the largest zoos in the province of Quebec
Félicie
Felice

French masculine given names